Big Planet is a science fiction novel by American writer Jack Vance. It is the first novel (the other being Showboat World) sharing the same setting, an immense, but metal-poor and backward world called Big Planet.

Big Planet was first published in Startling Stories (vol. 27 no. 2, September 1952), then cut and reissued in 1957 by Avalon Books.  It was later issued as part of Ace double novel D-295, paired with Vance's Slaves of the Klau. It was further cut in 1958. The text was restored in 1978.

Plot summary

Big Planet had been colonized hundreds of years prior to the start of the novel by misfits, faddists, cultists and anti-government advocates from Earth.  The environment is Earth-like, including the surface gravity; even though the planet is much larger than Earth (hence the name), it is much less dense, resulting from a scarcity of metal. As a result, a large number of technologically backward societies have developed, many of them ruled by petty tyrants and prey to lawlessness, murder, and mayhem.

Commissions from Earth have visited Big Planet at irregular intervals for 500 years to little effect; the majority of them are never heard from again. The latest, headed by Claude Glystra, arrives to try to stop the illegal importation of arms from Earth and halt Big Planet's slave trade, especially targeting Charley Lysidder, the ruthless, expansion-minded Bajarnum of Beaujolais. However, their starship is sabotaged by Lysidder's agents and crashes near a quaint village called Jubilith, near Beaujolais. 

The survivors attempt to reach Earth Enclave, 40,000 miles away, armed with little more than their wits and a few modern hand weapons. A Jubilith resident, Natilien-Thilssa, whom they call "Nancy," insists on tagging along, despite Glystra's opposition. The team begins to dwindle as Lysidder's efforts and the dangers of Big Planet take their toll. Nevertheless, by sheer tenacity, resourcefulness, and some luck, Glystra manages to triumph over Lysidder, despite the presence of Lysidder's agents within his own small group.

Among the many societies, benign or bizarre, that Glystra and his companions encounter along the wind-driven monoline (their version of the yellow brick road), is the quasi-utopian society of Kirstendale. At first, it appears to be based on snobbish principles, but an odd twist reveals it to be surprisingly egalitarian.

Literary significance and criticism
According to science fiction scholar Nick Gevers, Big Planet  was instrumental in the development of the planetary romance form...perhaps the first attempt at a convincingly complete imaginary world in genre s-f....[T]he conviction persists that it is not the characters who serve as the book's protagonists, but rather Big Planet itself.

References

External links
 List of editions at JackVance.com, with some cover scans
 Positive review by Nick Gevers
 More critical review by John Grant
 Quotes dealing with fictional "monoline" at Technovelgy
 

Novels by Jack Vance
Fictional terrestrial planets
1957 American novels
1957 science fiction novels
Works originally published in Startling Stories
Novels first published in serial form
Novels set on fictional planets
Avalon Books books